Choi Jong-hoan (or Choi Jong-hwan, ; born August 12, 1987) is a South Korean football player who plays for Suwon FC.

External links

1987 births
Living people
South Korean footballers
Association football fullbacks
Association football midfielders
Ulsan Hyundai Mipo Dockyard FC players
FC Seoul players
Incheon United FC players
Gimcheon Sangmu FC players
Seoul E-Land FC players
Suwon FC players
Korea National League players
K League 1 players
K League 2 players